Brantford Airport , also known as Brantford Municipal Airport, is a registered aerodrome located  west southwest of the City of Brantford, in the county of Brant, Ontario, Canada.

There is a single fixed-base operator at the airport. The airport hosts a widely attended air show every year at the end of August, featuring the Royal Canadian Air Force aerobatic team the Snowbirds and airplanes from the Canadian Warplane Heritage Museum. The airport is home to many of the area's general aviation aircraft. Aviation spare parts retailer Aircraft Spruce established its sole Canadian location here in 2008, with expansion plans announced in 2013. The airport is often used for film shoots; scenes from Welcome to Mooseport, Where The Truth Lies and multiple Mayday episodes have been filmed there.

Although the airport has never had scheduled air service, weekly charters fly students of the W. Ross Macdonald School home to Sudbury, Timmins, Trenton, Ottawa and Sault Ste. Marie.

The airport is classified as an airport of entry by Nav Canada and is staffed by the Canada Border Services Agency (CBSA) on a call-out basis from the John C. Munro Hamilton International Airport. The CBSA officers at this airport currently can handle general aviation aircraft only, with no more than 15 passengers.

History
A public aerodrome was established at Brantford in 1929 (located at Fairview and King George streets). The airport opened at its present location on 11 November 1940 as No. 5 Service Flying Training School, a Royal Canadian Air Force British Commonwealth Air Training Plan airfield.
It was not until 27 April 1970 that aerodrome lands and management duty were transferred from the federal government to the municipal level. The current terminal building was built in 1966.

The City of Brantford once looked at the possibility of closing the airport, but this move was widely opposed by local citizens, tenants, and users. In May 2007, Brantford City Council held a public forum to canvass views on the airport as a necessary service for the city. Many presentations made clear points that growing cities require airports as part of their fundamental infrastructure, to attract and retain corporate investment.

In January 2008, Brantford City Council voted unanimously to support the inclusion of $1.9 million in planned airport infrastructure upgrades in the city's Capital Plan for Fiscal 2008. That allowed for repaving the main runway and a second runway that was last paved in the 1940s. In 2004, 2009 and 2011, new rows of hangars were built, with plans for more in the future. In August 2014, an experimental aircraft crashed near the airport.

Early the next month, a small aircraft crashed while on approach to the airport, killing one pilot. On April 27, 2016, a Cessna 182 flipped over on the runway, injuring one pilot. A plane was found crashed on the runway in the morning of November 13, 2018, with two deceased occupants.

References

External links
Brantford Municipal Airport (official website)
Brantford Flight Centre
COPA Flight 148 Brantford - Local Canadian Owners and Pilots Association Group
Brantford Airport Closure Questioned - Press release from Brant Aero
Brant Aero - Avionics and maintenance shop based at the Airport
Brantford Municipal Airport on COPA's Places to Fly airport directory

Registered aerodromes in Ontario
Airports of the British Commonwealth Air Training Plan
Buildings and structures in Brantford
Transport in Brantford
1940 establishments in Ontario